The Sanibel Causeway is a causeway in Southwest Florida that spans San Carlos Bay, connecting Sanibel Island with the Florida mainland in Punta Rassa. The causeway consists of three separate two-lane bridge spans, and two-man-made causeway islands between them. The entire causeway facility is owned by Lee County and operated by the Lee County Department of Transportation. The bridges are not individually named, and are simply referred to as bridges A, B, and C. The islands are also named A and B. Both series begin from the mainland side.

Portions of the causeway were destroyed by Hurricane Ian on September 28, 2022 and reopened on October 19, 2022.

History 

As early as 1912, automobile ferries serviced Sanibel Island from the mainland at Punta Rassa. The idea of building a bridge from the mainland to the island was highly controversial amongst the early residents of the island, as many thought a bridge would ruin the beauty and isolated feel of the island, although one of the largest proponents of building a bridge was island resident Hugo Lindgren, who saw the island's potential and tried to convince Lee County to build a bridge. Despite the opinions of the islanders, it was clear that the ferries were insufficient by the mid-1950s as demand increased leading to long lines of vehicles waiting to cross the bay. Wildfires on the island in 1955 further convinced the county to build a bridge as it would improve access to the island for firefighters.

An early proposal would have had a bridge running from Point Ybel (where Sanibel Lighthouse is currently located) to the mainland, since it was the shortest route. The current route was ultimately selected due to the bay being shallower and two causeway islands could be created by dredging. While Bailey Road was then selected as the terminus of the bridge on the island, Hugo Lindgren granted the county right-of-way through his property on the bay, which the county accepted.

Construction on the entire causeway and the three original bridges lasted 15 months and cost $2.73 million. It was the last major project designed by Hector F.J. Estrup, Civil Engineer, owner of Caribbean Engineers. The Sanibel Causeway was completed and opened for traffic on May 26, 1963. Due to the causeway, Sanibel Island experienced major growth in the early 1970s leading to Sanibel's incorporation into Lee County's third city, which took place on November 5, 1974. Former congressman and CIA director Porter Goss served as Sanibel's first mayor.

By the early 1990s, the original bridges began showing signs of rapid deterioration due to the bay's saltwater, prompting the county to make major repairs. As a result, Lee County briefly proposed the idea of replacing the bridges with a single four-lane high-span bridge. This idea was abandoned due to opposition from island residents. Further repairs were made in 1997 as rapid deterioration from overall lack of maintenance and saltwater corrosion continued. In 2001, the county made plans to replace Bridges B and C, and make major repairs to Bridge A (the drawbridge).

In early 2003, during a routine inspection, severe cracks were discovered underneath a  deck section on Bridge B. After this discovery, all three of the bridges were very closely monitored, and the damaged section was braced with additional steel pilings. A temporary 10-ton weight limit was put in place. Lee County determined that the  deck section needed to be completely replaced as soon as possible. After extensive preparations, the causeway was shut down all day on January 20, 2003. The deck section was replaced with a steel grate section. The replacement was completed quickly, and the causeway re-opened ahead of schedule. After this turn of events, Lee County reexamined its original plan for rehabilitating Bridge A (the drawbridge), and concluded that all three of the bridges needed to be replaced as soon as possible.

Once it was decided to replace the drawbridge, a debate commenced on replacing it with another drawbridge versus a high-span bridge. The county wanted a high-span, while a number of Sanibel residents wanted another drawbridge. Shortly before construction was set to begin on the high-span bridge, the city filed a lawsuit against Lee County in an attempt to stop construction. Sanibel claimed that Lee County did not maintain the bridges properly, and used the toll revenue for other road projects. Lee County then filed a counter lawsuit, claiming Sanibel was interfering with construction. A second lawsuit against Lee County was filed by a group of Sanibel residents who created a non-profit organization called "Save Our Bay, Inc." All of the lawsuits delayed construction, and were eventually dismissed.

On August 13, 2004, the area was struck by Hurricane Charley, a Category 4 hurricane. The causeway received only minor damage and was very carefully inspected before Sanibel residents were permitted to return to the island.

Construction of the current bridges commenced in May 2004. The three-dollar toll was increased to six dollars in November 2004 to finance construction. Construction on the current spans lasted three years, and cost $137 million. An official grand-opening ceremony for the current bridges was held on September 8, 2007, which was the day the current Bridge C opened (even though the current Bridges A and B opened prior to September 8).

The original bridges were later demolished, and their remains were sunk into the water to create a number of artificial reefs in the San Carlos Bay and the Gulf of Mexico.

In March 2020, all of Lee County-owned toll bridges were temporarily transitioned to All-Electronic Tolling due to the COVID-19 pandemic. This change was made permanent on June 23, 2021. The $3 administrative fee for vehicles without transponders was suspended during the pandemic and was reinstated on October 1. The motorcycle discount plans were removed as part of the plan for a permanent transition to All-Electronic Tolling.

On September 28, 2022, Hurricane Ian partially destroyed the causeway, and the mainland approach was heavily damaged. Both the islands of Sanibel and Captiva were cut off from the mainland United States by road. No deaths or injuries were confirmed by the Lee County Sheriff's Office. After undergoing emergency repairs, the causeway reopened to trucks on October 11, and reopened to all vehicular traffic on October 20.

The bridges

Bridge A 
Bridge A is the bridge closest to the mainland at Punta Rassa. The current Bridge A finally opened for traffic on June 28, 2007, along with the current toll plaza.

The Sanibel-Captiva Optimists Club had held a raffle for the opportunity to be the operator of the drawbridge's machinery for its final opening. A private ceremony was held the day after the current bridge opened to commemorate the drawbridge's final opening. Seasonal Sanibel residents Bob and Ana Finks won the raffle, and they also got to keep the operating lever from the drawbridge's control room as part of the prize.

Bridge B 
Bridge B is the middle bridge, and is also the shortest of the three bridges. The current Bridge B opened for traffic on April 11, 2007, making it the first of the current spans to open. The current Bridge B was built ten feet taller than the original Bridge B to help reduce corrosion from salt spray, which was one of the major factors in the deterioration of the old bridge. Unlike the other two bridges, Bridge B is a low-level bridge, and has no navigation channel passing underneath.

The first few sets of piling from the original bridge on the south shore remain today. While the county initially planned to demolish the entire structure, a grassroots campaign was launched by local fisherman to have part of the span left intact for a fishing pier similar to the former spans of the Sunshine Skyway Bridge and the Overseas Highway. Despite the campaign initially succeeding, plans to install new deck sections on top of the pilings for the pier were scrapped in early 2010 due to budget cuts.

Bridge C 
Bridge C is the closest bridge to Sanibel Island, and is also the longest of the three bridges. The current Bridge C opened for traffic on September 8, 2007, making it the last of the current spans to open. Similar to Bridge B, the current Bridge C was also constructed ten feet taller than the original bridge.

Causeway Islands Park 

The causeway's islands were dredged from the San Carlos Bay when the original bridges were built. Since the completion of the current bridges, the islands have been operated as Causeway Islands Park by Lee County Parks and Recreation. The islands are referred to as Island A and Island B, and they serve as public beaches. Island B includes restroom facilities on each side of the road. The islands have always been a popular area among beachgoers for windsurfing and kitesurfing.

Media references 
In Blue Collar Comedy Tour: One for the Road (2006), comedian Ron White makes a reference to the old Sanibel Causeway bridge when he said he was pulled over for driving  in a 5-mile-per-hour zone on one of the bridges.

See also 
 Bonita Beach Causeway – a four-bridge causeway between Bonita Springs and Fort Myers Beach
 Matanzas Pass Bridge – connects Fort Myers Beach (on Estero Island) with the mainland

Other toll bridges in Lee County (both cross the Caloosahatchee River between Fort Myers and Cape Coral):

 Cape Coral Bridge
 Midpoint Memorial Bridge

References

External links 

 Webpage for the toll bridge on the Lee County government website
 Webpage for the causeway islands park on the Lee County government website

Bridges in Lee County, Florida
Causeways in Florida
Road bridges in Florida
Roads in Lee County, Florida
Sanibel, Florida
Toll bridges in Florida
Bridges completed in 1963
1963 establishments in Florida
Concrete bridges in the United States
Girder bridges in the United States
Bridges completed in 2007